Kubova Huť is a municipality and village in Prachatice District in the South Bohemian Region of the Czech Republic. It has about 90 inhabitants. It is known for the highest railway station in the country.

Etymology
The name means "Kuba's smelter". It was derived from the Guba's Forest (which was named after the castle governor) and from the glassmaking in the area.

Geography

It lies in the Bohemian Forest and in the Šumava Protected Landscape Area.

History
The first written mention of Kubova Huť is from 1728. Originally, the village was a settlement of glassmakers.

Transport
Kubova Huť is located on the railroad from Volary to Strakonice.

References

External links

Villages in Prachatice District
Bohemian Forest